Behavior analysis or behavior analytics may refer to:

 Applied behavior analysis
 Behavior analysis of child development
 Behavioral analytics, in business analytics
 Behaviorism, where behavior analysis is practiced
 Clinical behavior analysis
 Licensed behavior analyst
 Professional practice of behavior analysis
 Quantitative analysis of behavior
 User behavior analytics, in cybersecurity